Dwayne Desmond Whylly Jr. (born 26 November 1986) is a Bahamian footballer who plays as a goalkeeper for the Bahamas national team.

Education
 Yale University (2004-2008), at Yale he pledged Delta Kappa Epsilon
 Harris Manchester College, Oxford University, Law (2008-2010)

Club career
He played for St. Georges School in Rhode Island before teaming up at Yale in 2004. In 2006, he played for Albany Admirals in the USL Premier Development League.

International career
He played for the Bahamas national youth and U-23 teams.

Whylly made his debut for the senior Bahamas in a March 2004 World Cup qualification match against Dominica, aged 17. He had earned 14 caps by January 2018, six of them in World Cup qualification games.

Personal life
Whylly works as an associatie for a Finance and Legal firm in Nassau.

References

External links
 Yale Bulldogs profile 
 

1986 births
Living people
Sportspeople from Nassau, Bahamas
Association football goalkeepers
Bahamian footballers
Bahamas international footballers
Yale Bulldogs men's soccer players
Albany BWP Highlanders players
Oxford City Nomads F.C. players
Witney Town F.C. players
Bahamian expatriate footballers
Expatriate soccer players in the United States
Expatriate footballers in England
Expatriate footballers in Switzerland
USL League Two players
BFA Senior League players
Bahamian expatriate sportspeople in the United States
Bahamian expatriate sportspeople in England
Bahamian expatriate sportspeople in Switzerland
Alumni of Harris Manchester College, Oxford